World Without End is an eight-episode 2012 television miniseries based on the 2007 novel of the same name by Ken Follett. It is a sequel to the 2010 miniseries The Pillars of the Earth, also based on a Follett novel. World Without End is set 150 years after The Pillars of the Earth and chronicles the experiences of the English town of Kingsbridge during the start of the Hundred Years' War and the outbreak of the Black Death. The cast is led by Cynthia Nixon, Miranda Richardson, Ben Chaplin, Peter Firth, Charlotte Riley, and Tom Weston-Jones. The miniseries differs significantly from the novel in both the plot and characterizations.

Filming took place in Hungary, Slovakia and Austria. John Pielmeier adapted the screenplay and Michael Caton-Jones directed all eight episodes.

Overview
Set in England during the 14th century, the series chronicles the lives of ordinary citizens. Edward III leads the nation into the Hundred Years' War with France, while Europe faced the Black Death. Caris (Charlotte Riley), a visionary woman, and her lover Merthin (Tom Weston-Jones) build a community that stands up to the crown and the church.

Cast and characters
 Ben Chaplin as King Edward II / Sir Thomas Langley
 Charlotte Riley as Caris Wooler
 Nora von Waldstätten as Gwenda
 Oliver Jackson-Cohen as Ralph Fitzgerald
 Rupert Evans as Godwyn
 Tom Weston-Jones as Merthin Fitzgerald
 Cynthia Nixon as Petranilla
 Tom Cullen as Wulfric
 Blake Ritson as King Edward III
 Hera Hilmar as Margery
 Aure Atika as Queen Isabella
 Tatiana Maslany as Sister Mair
 Miranda Richardson as Mother Cecilia
 Peter Firth as Earl Roland
 Sarah Gadon as Lady Phillippa
 Ian Pirie as Elfric
 Carlo Rota as Edmund
 Kostja Ullmann as Holger
 David Bradley as Brother Joseph
 Caroline Boulton as Sister Elizabeth
 Megan Follows as Maud
 Indira Varma as Mattie Wise
 Dan Cade as Handsome Jim
 Hannes Jaenicke as Roger Mortimer

Production
While acquiring the rights to The Pillars of the Earth from Ken Follett, Tandem Communications also secured a first right to negotiate a deal for World Without End, the sequel to the first novel. The project was announced in December 2010. The World Without End miniseries was co-produced by Tandem with Scott Free Productions, Canadian-based Take 5 Productions and Galafilm. John Pielmeier, who adapted The Pillars of the Earth, wrote the screenplay. Michael Caton-Jones signed on as director in March 2011.

Casting for the main roles was completed in June 2011, and filming began a month later in Europe. Shooting took place primarily in Hungary, where an entire medieval town was constructed on a 12,000-m2 backlot at Korda Studios west of Budapest. Additional location shoots took place in Slovakia and Austria.

Broadcast
World Without End has been acquired by Sat.1 in Germany, Channel 4 in the United Kingdom, Shaw Media in Canada, Cuatro in Spain, ORF in Austria, Sky Italia in Italy, DR in Denmark and TV2 in Hungary. In the United States, Starz, which aired The Pillars of the Earth, could not reach an agreement with Tandem to air the show. The series was acquired by ReelzChannel instead.

In Canada it premiered on 4 September 2012 on Showcase; and in Australia on 7 December 2014, as 90 minute combined episodes on ABC. In the U.S., four 2-hour episodes were aired, the first on 17 Oct 2012 on ReelzChannel.

The eight hours were similarly divided into four episodes when broadcast in Italy on Sky Movies between 11 November and 2 December 2012. The series was broadcast under the title of Mondo Senza Fine with a choice of Italian-dubbed audio or the original English audio.

Episodes

Home media releases 
World Without End was released by Sony Pictures Home Entertainment on 4 December 2012 in DVD and Blu-ray Disc formats. The two-disc sets contain the featurette "The Making Of Ken Follett's World Without End".

References

External links
Official website

2012 Canadian television series debuts
2012 Canadian television series endings
2010s Canadian television miniseries
2010s German television miniseries
Adaptations of works by Ken Follett
Black Death in fiction
Hundred Years' War in fiction
Sat.1 original programming
Television series by Tandem Productions
Television series by Scott Free Productions
Television series set in the Middle Ages
Television series set in the 14th century
Television shows based on British novels
Television shows directed by Michael Caton-Jones
Television shows filmed in Hungary
Edward II of England
Edward III of England